Boronia prolixa is a species of plant in the citrus family Rutaceae and is endemic to a small area in the Northern Territory, Australia. It is a low-lying shrub with hairy branches, leaves and flower parts, simple leaves and white to pink flowers with the sepals longer and wider than the petals.

Description
Its branches, leaves and some flower parts are covered with star-like hairs. The sepals and petals enlarge as the fruit develops. Flowering occurs mainly from February to June.

Taxonomy and naming
Boronia prolixa was first formally described in 1997 by Marco F. Duretto who published the description in  Australian Systematic Botany. The specific epithet (prolixa) is a Latin word meaning "stretched out" or "long".

Distribution and habitat
Boronia prolixa grows in sandstone heath and woodland on the north-western Arnhem Plateau.

References 

prolixa
Flora of the Northern Territory
Plants described in 1997
Taxa named by Marco Duretto